Pareto is a comune (municipality) in the Province of Alessandria in the Italian region Piedmont, located about  southeast of Turin and about  southwest of Alessandria.

Pareto borders the following municipalities: Cartosio, Giusvalla, Malvicino, Mioglia, Ponzone, Sassello, and Spigno Monferrato.

The village is located on a steep hill, almost 500 meters above sea level.

The name of the village has been mistakenly interpreted according to a paretimology that connects it with Latin piretus, 'pear (tree) orchard'. This is evidently a paretymology, deriving, instead, the toponym from the Indo-European root *br- / *bar-, with the meaning of 'rock', 'stone', 'hill', 'mountain', 'slope', = Latin pǎrǐēs, 'mountain face', 'rock wall'. The toponym would have originated in Indo-European times (Par-eto ~ Par- < PIE *br- / *bar-, 'stone', 'hill', 'mountain', 'slope', + -eto [< Latin -etum, 'village'] = *breto / *bar-eto → *par-eto = Pareto, 'village located on a hill').

Twin towns — sister cities
Pareto di Borbera is twinned with:

  Cauto Cristo, Cuba

References

Cities and towns in Piedmont